Ilse Martha Ries-Hotz (born 27 July 1949) is a Luxembourgian archer. She competed in the women's individual event at the 1988 Summer Olympics.

References

1949 births
Living people
Luxembourgian female archers
Olympic archers of Luxembourg
Archers at the 1988 Summer Olympics